Ergonomics in Design: The Quarterly of Human Factors Applications is a quarterly peer-reviewed academic journal that covers research in the field of ergonomics. The editor-in-chief is Rammohan V. Maikala (Providence Regional Medical Center Everett). It was established in 1993 and is currently published by SAGE Publications in association with the Human Factors and Ergonomics Society.

Abstracting and indexing 
Ergonomics in Design is abstracted and indexed in:
 Compendex
 Design and Applied Arts Index
 Emerging Sources Citation Index (ESCI)
 Engineering Index Monthly
 Ergonomics Abstracts
 Scopus

External links 
 

SAGE Publishing academic journals
English-language journals
Engineering journals
Quarterly journals
Publications established in 1993